The Daihatsu Bee is a three-wheeled microcar produced by the Japanese automobile manufacturer Daihatsu from 1951 until 1952.

Overview
Although Daihatsu had been producing motorized tricycles for carrying freight since 1930, and had also produced a small car for military use in 1937, the Bee was the first passenger car the company built for sale to the general public. The car was marketed from October 1951, shortly before the company changed its name from 'Hatsudoki Seizo Co' to Daihatsu. The Bee's model code is PCA.

The car had a two-door fibreglass, saloon body, and was popular as a taxi in Japan where licensing regulations permitted a lower charge per mile for three wheel vehicles than for four. Power was provided by a rear-mounted 540 cc OHV air-cooled two-cylinder four-stroke engine.  It was the first car in Japan with a horizontally opposed engine. The car was adapted from one of Daihatsu's three-wheeled delivery trucks. It sold very poorly, production was highly labor-intensive and ceased after only approximately 300 units were built.

Notes

References

External links
Source of secondary information about the car
 Photographs of the Bee showing the engine and other views
Daihatsu publicity photograph of their museum car
Daihatsu archive photograph of the Bee

Bee
Three-wheeled motor vehicles
First car made by manufacturer
Cars powered by boxer engines
Rear-engined vehicles